The Iranian ambassador in Canberra is the official representative of the Government in Tehran to the Government of Australia.

List of representatives

See also
List of Australian Ambassadors to Iran
Iran–Australia relations

References 

Ambassadors of Iran to Australia
Australia
Iran